Gemmellaro is a surname. Notable people with the surname include:

Carlo Gemmellaro (1787–1866), Italian naturalist and geologist
Gaetano Giorgio Gemmellaro (1832–1904), Italian geologist, paleontologist, and politician

Italian-language surnames